Andreas Heimann (born 10 January 1992) is a German chess grandmaster.

Chess career
He played for Germany's C team at the 38th Chess Olympiad, scoring 4½/8 (+3–2=3). He earned his international master title in 2009 and his grandmaster title in 2016. He is the No. 12 ranked German player as of October 2017.

References

External links

Living people
1992 births
Chess grandmasters
Chess Olympiad competitors
German chess players
People from Rheinfelden (Baden)
Sportspeople from Freiburg (region)